SKF-91488 is a histamine N-methyltransferase inhibitor. It prevents the degradation of histamine, leading to increased histamine levels.

See also
α-Fluoromethylhistidine
Histidine methyl ester

References

Histamine
Transferase inhibitors